Allyene is a rural commune located in M'diq-Fnideq Prefecture, Morocco. The settlement has a population of 6126.

References

Rural communes of Tanger-Tetouan-Al Hoceima
Populated places in M'diq-Fnideq Prefecture